(1852–1934) was a yōga artist in Meiji to Shōwa Japan.

Life
Born in Edo in 1852, as a child he began to study under , before moving to Osaka prior to his grandfather's appointment as bugyō (magistrate).

Initially sponsored by Katsu Kaishū, with Tokugawa support he studied political law in America in 1871, travelling the following year to France and Italy. In Venice he turned to the study of painting. Returning to Japan in 1881, he worked for the Ministry of Finance Printing Bureau before resigning over a disagreement and opening a school for painting in Kōjimachi.

Within a decade the association had been eclipsed by Kuroda Seiki's .

Kawamura Kiyoo often painted in western-style oil on traditional Japanese supports of silk and wood. He died in Tenri in 1934.

Selected paintings

See also
Founding of the Nation
 Takahashi Yuichi

References

External links

1852 births
1934 deaths
19th-century Japanese painters
20th-century Japanese painters
Yōga painters
Artists from Tokyo